Barbara Angell (6 March 1935) also known as a performer as Barb Angell, Barbara Angela Angell, Barbara Angel and as a screenwriter Angela Barr – is an Australian actress, playwright/dramatist, composer, lyricist, writer, orchestrator, comedian, director, producer, singer (soprano), dancer/choreographer and ice skater.

Angell has also worked internationally in the United Kingdom and the United States. She was notable for being Australia's first female television comedy writer-entertainer. 

Angell starred in and wrote for the satirical TV series The Mavis Bramston Show, as well as writing for Neighbours and New Zealand series Shortland Street.

Biography and career
She was born in Melbourne and educated at Presbyterian Ladies' College. before studying at the Melba Conservatorium as a soprano.

Angell began as an actress with the Melbourne Little Theatre (later St Martins) under Brett Randall and Irene Mitchell, for whom she debuted in their 1955 production of The Guinea Pig. She worked as a dancer-comedian with the Tivoli Circuit from 1955 to 1958, and in comedy sketches. 

She was in Melbourne's first TV variety show, a live weekly program called Tivoli Party Time (1956–7), as one of the nuclear cast that featured her with Buster Fiddess, Iris Shand (wife of actor Ron Shand) and Don Williams. In this show she wrote her own comedy material.

She visited the UK in 1959–60 where she performed a solo cabaret act, further featuring her comedy sketches, music and lyrics . On returning to Australia, she formed a Revue company with Jon Finlayson at Melbourne's Arrow Theatre and co-wrote and produced a series of productions there including Slings 'n' Arrows and Outrageous Fortune – the titles both from the one line in Shakespeare! See Wendy Harmer's book, It's a Joke, Joyce (Pan Books 1989). On stage, Barbara Angell starred again for the Tivoli in Lilac Time with John Larsen and in The Wizard of Oz as Glinda the Good Witch opposite Reg Livermore's Wicked Witch. Under the guidance of John McCallum at J. C. Williamson, she understudied Jill Perryman in Carnival and Maggie Fitzgibbon in Noël Coward's Sail Away. She wrote TV sketches, music and lyrics for the satirical The Mavis Bramston Show from Episode 1 throughout its 4-year run and starred in it with Ron Frazer during its last 2 years .

Following the Australian tour with Madge Ryan for J.C. Williamsons in Peter Shaffer's play Black Comedy she returned to England in 1969, where she spent the next 20 years appearing on stage, in films and TV dramas and comedies . She was production coordinator of the Association of Australian Artistes, based at the Australian High Commission in London. She leased The Arts Theatre in Great Newport Street, WC2, for lunchtime theatre in the 1970s and directed a series of plays including some of her own. She wrote TV sketches for Dave Allen and became a script assessor for the BBC's light entertainment department. Her TV play Some Day Man won a nationwide competition in the U.K. and was produced by David Cunliffe for Yorkshire Television in 1987. In 2005, Angell played a cameo role in the movie Superman Returns, filmed at Fox Studios, Sydney, Australia.

Publications 
Her first book The Entertainment Machine was published in 1972 (Horwitz), her second, Voyage To Port Phillip, 1803 in 1983 (Nepean Historical Society) her third book A Woman's War in 2003 (New Holland Publishers) but most of her writing career has been for television and the stage. Her latest book The Coral Browne Story: Theatrical Life and Times of a Lustrous Australian was published in Sydney in May 2007 by her own company Angell Productions Pty Limited.

Community work 
Angell served on the Council of the Alzheimer's Disease Society in UK and Australia (now known as Alzheimer's Australia), was President of the NSW (1991–3) and National chapters (1993–4). She is currently Director of Performing Arts for the Hornsby Arts Council.

Education 
In 2008 she completed a professional research doctorate in Visual and Performing Arts with Charles Sturt University, her major paper being Another Coral Browne Story: analysis of the continuing export of Australia's performing arts talent (yet to be published). She continues to teach and to write.

Filmography

References 

 Performing Arts Collection, Melbourne, The Barbara Angell Collection.

Further reading
 History Magazine, No. 96, June 2008, p. 15; North Shore Times, Friday, 18 January 2008; Sydney Observer, December 2007, p. 55; The Monthly, Issue 30, December 2007 – January 2008, p. 76; On Stage, Vol 8 No. 3, Winter 2007, p. 30
 Van Straten, Frank, Tivoli,Thomas C. Lothian Pty Ltd, 2003, p. 203; Harmer, Wendy, It's a Joke, Joyce, Pan Books, 1989, pp. 57–60

External links 
 Barbara Angell Collection, at the Performing Arts Collection, Arts Centre Melbourne.
 
 The Mavis Bramston Show: 
 Some Day Man, TSW Education Dept, Plymouth, UK: 

1935 births
Living people
Actresses from Melbourne
Australian film actresses
Australian soap opera actresses
Australian stage actresses
Australian non-fiction writers
People educated at the Presbyterian Ladies' College, Melbourne
20th-century Australian actresses
21st-century Australian actresses